The 2021 Ukrainian Cup Final decided the winner of the 2020–21 Ukrainian Cup, the 30th season of the annual Ukrainian football cup competition. It was played on 13 May 2021 at the Ternopil City Stadium in Ternopil between Dynamo Kyiv and Zorya Luhansk. This was the first time the cup final was held in Ternopil. Previously on 4 March 2021 it was decided that nominal host of the final is Dynamo.

Ukrainian Association of Football assured that the stadium will host the 2021 Ukrainian Cup Final after the 2020 final, originally planned to be held on 13 May 2020 at Ternopilsky Misky Stadion, was postponed due to COVID-19 pandemic in Ukraine and first moved to Arena Lviv in Lviv, and then, considering the better epidemiological situation, to Kharkiv at Metalist Stadium. On March 5, 2021, the Ternopil City Council adopted its decision to honor the stadium with a controversial historical Ukrainian person Roman Shukhevych. It took a brief time before the Ukrainian Association of Football has adopted the new stadium's name originally referring to it by its previous name.

On 30 April 2021 it was announced that UA:First will be main broadcaster of the game. Before the start of the game, teams commemorated Valeriy Lobanovsky who died on 13 May 2002 with a minute of silence.

Road to the final 

Zorya started its campaign in the Round of 16, while Dynamo in the Quarterfinals.

Note: In all results below, the score of the finalist is given first (H: home; A: away).

Dynamo Kyiv
As a Ukrainian Premier League team, Dynamo entered the competition in the quarter-finals with a home match against fellow Ukrainian Premier League side Kolos Kovalivka. Dynamo won on penalties 4–3 after tying at 0. In the semi-finals at Ternopil City Stadium, they played Ukrainian First League team Ahrobiznes Volochysk which was a conditional host. Dynamo won 3–0 with goals from Bohdan Lyednyev, Artem Besyedin, Vitaliy Buyalskyi and reached their fourth final in five years.

Zorya Luhansk
As a Premier League team, Zorya Luhansk started in the Round of 16, away at Ukrainian Premier League side Desna Chernihiv. At the Valeriy Lobanovskyi Dynamo Stadium in Kyiv, Zorya Luhansk won 1–0 with a penalty goal from Vladlen Yurchenko. In the quarter-finals, they were drawn away at Ukrainian First League team Veres Rivne and won 2–1 at the Avanhard Stadium in Lutsk due to goals from Dmytro Ivanisenia and Vladyslav Kocherhin. In the semi-finals at away CSC Nika Stadium, they played fellow Ukrainian Premier League FC Oleksandriya and reached their second final with a 4–3 penalty shootout win after tying at 1 in regulation time with a Kocherhin goal.

Previous encounters 
In overall, games between teams started during the Soviet epoch, Dynamo Kyiv and Zorya Luhansk have previously met 81 times, from which 51 were won by Dynamo, 22 were drawn and 8 won by Zorya. In domestic cup competitions they first met back in 1970. Including games of the Soviet Cup and Ukrainian Cup both teams met 7 times, from which 6 were won by Dynamo and 1 won by Zorya. This final is the second meeting of two clubs at this stage, which previously met in 1974 as part of the Soviet Cup when Dynamo beat Zorya in extra time. 

As part of Ukrainian Cup competitions (since 1992), both clubs met four times all of which were won by Dynamo. The first time they met only in 2008, twice in 2015 and again in 2016.

For Dynamo Kyiv, this final was the 18th overall, with 12 wins in the previous 17 final appearances. Zorya is playing in their second Ukrainian Cup Final after 2016, when they lost to Shakhtar Donetsk 0–2.

Teams at the competition's finals

Beside the Ukrainian Cup, both teams also competed at the Soviet Cup before 1992 and have reached finals on several occasions. Once in 1974 both teams met in the Soviet Cup Final at Luzhniki Stadium in Moscow (today in the Russian Federation). In total Dynamo and Zorya met three times including one final game.

Match

 Note: position and roster number is per the Ukrainian Premier League (and Footboom)

References

External links
 Ukrainian Cup. UEFA.
 Ukrainian Cup (English version) / Ukrainian Cup (Ukrainian version). Ukrainian Association of Football.
 Ukrainian Cup. Soccerway.
 Dynamo – Zorya H2H stats. Soccerway.

Cup Final
Ukrainian Cup finals
Ukrainian Cup Final 2021
Ukrainian Cup Final 2021
Ukrainian Cup Final 2021
Ukrainian Cup Final